West Aceh Regency is a regency in the Aceh special region of Indonesia. It is located on the island of Sumatra. The regency currently covers an area of 2,927.95 square kilometres and had a population of 173,558 at the 2010 Census and 198,736 at the 2020 Census. The official estimate as at mid 2021 was 200,579. The town of Meulaboh remains the seat of the regency government (notwithstanding unsubstantiated reports that on 8 July 2013 it was separated out as an independent city). The regency is a palm oil-producing area. Some of the people of the regency are Minangkabau-descended Aneuk Jamee.

The regency was among the hardest-hit areas during the 2004 Indian Ocean earthquake.

The regency is bordered by the regencies of Aceh Jaya to the west, Pidie to the north, Central Aceh to the northeast, and Nagan Raya to the southeast, and by the Indian Ocean to the southwest.

Administrative districts 
The regency was divided administratively into twelve districts (kecamatan), listed below with their areas and populations at the 2010 Census and the 2020 Census, together with the official estimates as at mid 2021. The table also includes the location of the district administrative centres, and the number of administrative villages (rural desa and urban kelurahan) in each district, and its post code.

See also 

 List of regencies and cities of Indonesia

References 

Regencies of Aceh